Melissa González (born January 24, 1989) is an American field hockey player. At the 2012 Summer Olympics, she competed for the national team. She was born in Peekskill, New York.
She attended Lakeland High School. González completed her collegiate field hockey career at the University of Connecticut. She gained multiple awards during her collegiate career including First Team All-American and Big East Conference Defensive Player of the Year. González has competed in World Championship games since 2014. She was named Best Player of the Tournament at the 2017 World League Semifinals in Johannesburg, South Africa. González's Olympic experience includes the 2012 Olympic Games in London, England, and the 2016 Olympic Games in Rio de Janeiro, Brazil. In addition to playing, she has been a volunteer assistant coach at UConn, Yale and the University of Massachusetts.

References

External links
 

American female field hockey players
1989 births
Living people
Olympic field hockey players of the United States
Field hockey players at the 2012 Summer Olympics
Field hockey players at the 2016 Summer Olympics
Field hockey players at the 2011 Pan American Games
Pan American Games gold medalists for the United States
UConn Huskies field hockey players
Pan American Games medalists in field hockey
Female field hockey midfielders
People from Cortlandt, New York
Medalists at the 2011 Pan American Games
Medalists at the 2015 Pan American Games